The 2019 National Lacrosse League season, formally known as the 2018–2019 season, is the 33rd in the history of the NLL. It was originally scheduled to begin on December 1, 2018 and ending with the NLL final in late spring of 2019. This season is the inaugural season for the expansion teams San Diego Seals and Philadelphia Wings. This is also the final season for the Rochester Knighthawks under owner Curt Styres, as the team's operations are being relocated to Halifax for the 2019–20 season while Pegula Sports and Entertainment takes over the Knighthawks moniker with a new expansion team.

The Professional Lacrosse Players Association, who represents the NLL players, opted out of their seven-year collective bargaining agreement after the fifth season (2017–18) seeking a new deal.  On November 15, 2018 the league announced that a counter-proposal submitted by the Professional Lacrosse Players Association was rejected. This came after the league suspended their Wednesday November 14 deadline to review the counter-proposal after the PLPA rejected the league's offer; the PLPA advised its members not to attend training camp and thus effectively went on strike. Subsequent to this the league announced that all games to be played in the first two weeks of the season (encompassing December 1 and 8 weekends) were cancelled. On November 24 the NLL and the PLPA came to an agreement on the CBA for 5 years, ending the labor dispute.

Regular season

Playoffs

*Overtime

Awards

Annual awards

References: Nominees and Winners

Stadiums and locations

Attendance

See also
 2019 in sports

References
5. http://pointstreak.com/prostats/attendance.html?leagueid=230&seasonid=18464

National Lacrosse League
National Lacrosse League seasons